The Martyrdom of Four Saints is an oil on canvas painting by the  Italian Renaissance artist Correggio, dating from around  1524  and housed in the Galleria Nazionale of Parma, Italy.

History
The work is one of the canvasses commissioned by Parmesan noble Placido Del Bono for a chapel in the church of San Giovanni Evangelista in Parma. They are mentioned (although wrongly assigned to the city's cathedral) by late Renaissance art biographer Giorgio Vasari in the first edition of his Lives (1550).

The subject of the painting, rather rare in western religious art, is the martyrdom of Placidus and his sister Flavia (who had allegedly lived in the 4th century) and, behind them, that of two earlier Roman siblings, Eutychius and Victorinus, who appear to have been already beheaded. An angel flies above them and holds the palm of martyrdom.

Sources

External links
Page at  Correggio Art Home website 

Religious paintings by Correggio
1524 paintings
Collections of the Galleria nazionale di Parma
Paintings about death
Christian art about death
Angels in art